The 1979 New York Yankees season was the 77th season for the franchise. The season was marked by the death of their starting catcher, Thurman Munson, on August 2. The team finished with a record of 89–71, finishing fourth in the American League East, 13.5 games behind the Baltimore Orioles, ending the Yankees' three-year domination of the AL East. New York was managed by Billy Martin, and Bob Lemon. The Yankees played at Yankee Stadium. 

As the Munson Era came to a tragic end within this season, a new era was about to unfold. 1979 marked the first time ever for the Yankees to broadcast their games on cable within New York City and surrounding areas, becoming the first ever MLB team to do so. Starting Opening Day that year, all Yankees games save for the nationally aired games were broadcast on the then 3-year old cable channel SportsChannel NY (aside from the usual WPIX telecast for free to air television viewers in the New York area and nationwide via satellite and cable).

Offseason 
In January 1979, the Yankees attempted to acquire first baseman Rod Carew from the Minnesota Twins in exchange for Chris Chambliss, Juan Beníquez, Dámaso García, and Dave Righetti, but the deal fell through. Carew was later traded to the California Angels.

Notable transactions 
 November 10, 1978: Sparky Lyle, Domingo Ramos, Mike Heath, Larry McCall, Dave Rajsich, and cash were traded by the Yankees to the Texas Rangers for Dave Righetti, Juan Beníquez, Mike Griffin, Paul Mirabella and Greg Jemison (minors).
 November 13, 1978: Luis Tiant was signed as a free agent by the Yankees.
 November 21, 1978: Tommy John was signed as a free agent by the Yankees.
 December 4, 1978: Bobby Brown was drafted from the Yankees by the New York Mets in the 1978 rule 5 draft.

Regular season 
In mid-April, closer Rich “Goose” Gossage broke the thumb on his pitching hand in a clubhouse fight with teammate Cliff Johnson.  Gossage missed the rest of April, all of May, and half of June with the injury.  Ron Guidry volunteered to take his place as bullpen closer along with his regular starts and posted two saves. Johnson was later traded to the Cleveland Indians.

Bob Lemon, who had taken over the team in July 1978 after Billy Martin resigned amid controversy where he called Reggie Jackson and George Steinbrenner liars, entered the season with the understanding that he would be promoted to a front office position following the season. However, after a 34–31 start to the season, Steinbrenner fired Lemon and asked Martin, who was to take over the team in 1980, to start managing early. Martin agreed, which did not sit well with some of the team including Jackson. The move also did not sit well with team president Al Rosen, who resigned from the Yankees shortly thereafter.

On August 6, the Yankees flew to Ohio to attend Thurman Munson's memorial service, then flew back to New York to play their scheduled game against Baltimore. This game was televised live nationwide on ABC's Monday Night Baseball and featured clips of the memorial and an interview Munson gave to Howard Cosell days before. Bobby Murcer hit a three-run home run in the bottom of the seventh inning, then drove in two more runs in the ninth with a single off former Yankee Tippy Martinez to account for all five Yankee runs in a 5–4 win. After the game, Murcer gave the bat to Munson's widow.

On September 12, Carl Yastrzemski of the Boston Red Sox joined the 3,000 hit club with a single off Jim Beattie of the Yankees. The same game also marked the final appearance at Fenway Park for Hall of Fame pitcher Catfish Hunter.

On September 18, pitcher Bob Kammeyer set a single-season record by giving up eight earned runs without recording an out in his only game of the season. It was his last major league appearance.

Thurman Munson 

As his career progressed, Thurman Munson became increasingly homesick as his schedule did not allow him to spend enough time at home with his wife and children. Since he kept his home in Ohio during the offseason, he decided that air travel was the best solution and began taking flying lessons. Munson bought a Cessna Citation I/SP jet and by 1979 was regularly using it to transport himself to and from various cities and his home. On one of these trips, where his manager Billy Martin was a passenger, Martin noticed the plane's engine malfunctioned in flight and informed Munson, who discovered the entire engine was destroyed and he had to pay to have a new one installed. Martin grew concerned but was unable to convince Munson to stop.

On August 2, 1979, Munson was at the Akron-Canton Regional Airport practicing takeoffs and landings. On the fourth touch-and-go, Munson failed to lower the flaps for landing and allowed the aircraft to sink too low before increasing engine power, causing the jet to clip a tree and fall short of the runway. The plane then hit a tree stump and burst into flames. Munson suffered a broken neck on impact and thus was trapped inside the aircraft, unable to move. His companions were able to escape the wreck. Munson was consumed by the flames and toxic fumes released by the burning fuselage and died of asphyxiation. He was 32 years old.

Munson's sudden death was major news across the nation and his loss was especially felt in the baseball community. Munson was survived by his wife, Diana, and their three children. The day after his death, before the start of the Yankees' four-game set with the Baltimore Orioles in the Bronx, the Yankees paid tribute to their fallen captain in a pre-game ceremony during which the starters stood at their defensive positions, save for the catcher's box, which remained empty. At the conclusion of Robert Merrill's musical selection, the fans (announced attendance 51,151) burst into a 10-minute standing ovation.

Season standings

Record vs. opponents

Notable transactions 
 April 12, 1979: Paul Blair was released by the Yankees.
 April 19, 1979: Bobby Brown was purchased by the Yankees from the Toronto Blue Jays.
 May 11, 1979: Jim Kaat was purchased by the Yankees from the Philadelphia Phillies.
 May 23, 1979: Dick Tidrow was traded by the Yankees to the Chicago Cubs for Ray Burris.
 June 5, 1979: 1979 Major League Baseball draft
Don Mattingly was drafted by the Yankees in the 19th round.
Otis Nixon was drafted by the Yankees in the 1st round (3rd pick) of the secondary phase. Player signed June 9, 1979.
 June 15, 1979: Jay Johnstone was traded by the Yankees to the San Diego Padres for Dave Wehrmeister.
 June 26, 1979: Paul Semall (minors) was traded by the Yankees to the Chicago Cubs for Bobby Murcer.
 August 1, 1979: Mickey Rivers and players to be named later were traded by the Yankees to the Texas Rangers for Oscar Gamble, Amos Lewis (minors) and players to be named later. The deal was completed on October 8, when the Rangers sent Ray Fontenot and Gene Nelson to the Yankees, and the Yankees sent Bob Polinsky (minors), Neal Mersch (minors), and Mark Softy (minors) to the Rangers to complete the trade.
 August 20, 1979: Ray Burris was selected off waivers from the Yankees by the New York Mets.

Roster

Player stats

Batting

Starters by position 
Note: Pos = Position; G = Games played; AB = At bats; H = Hits; Avg. = Batting average; HR = Home runs; RBI = Runs batted in

Other batters 
Note: G = Games played; AB = At bats; H = Hits; Avg. = Batting average; HR = Home runs; RBI = Runs batted in

Pitching

Starting pitchers 
Note: G = Games pitched; IP = Innings pitched; W = Wins; L = Losses; ERA = Earned run average; SO = Strikeouts

Other pitchers 
Note: G = Games pitched; IP = Innings pitched; W = Wins; L = Losses; ERA = Earned run average; SO = Strikeouts

Relief pitchers 
Note: G = Games pitched; W = Wins; L = Losses; SV = Saves; ERA = Earned run average; SO = Strikeouts

Awards and honors

All-Stars 

 Ron Guidry, reserve
 Reggie Jackson, reserve
 Tommy John, reserve
 Graig Nettles, reserve

Farm system 

LEAGUE CHAMPIONS: Columbus, West Haven, Oneonta, Paintsville

Off-season

On October 23, manager Billy Martin got into a barroom fight with Joseph Cooper, a marshmallow salesman from Minnesota. Six days later, Martin was fired from the Yankees by George Steinbrenner and replaced with Dick Howser.

Notes

References 
1979 New York Yankees at Baseball Reference
1979 New York Yankees at Baseball Almanac

New York Yankees seasons
New York Yankees
New York Yankees
1970s in the Bronx